GN&SR may refer to:

Transport
 Great Northern and Southern Railway, a fictional railway company featured in The Railway Children
 Great Northern and Strand Railway, an underground railway company in London from 1898 to 1902

See also
 GNSR (Great North of Scotland Railway)